"Fight for Love" is a song by American pop singer (former American Idol finalist)  Elliott Yamin. It is the title track and first single from his second album, Fight for Love. The song was released for streaming to AOL Music on February 13, 2009 and for adds at Top 40 (CHR) and Rhythmic radio on March 10, 2009. It also became available for download at digital music outlets on March 10 in two versions - with or without piano introduction.

Song information
Yamin describes the song:
"'Fight for Love' epitomizes what the record is really about --it’s about love and fighting for it, with it, in it and out of it. I love the lyrics. It’s a feel-good song that's very relatable. Everyone has been through a broken heart before and later found someone better -- someone worthy of fighting for."

Video
The video for "Fight for Love" premiered on AOL Music on May 1, 2009. AOL Music’s PopEater blog describes it as “what might be the world's coolest scavenger hunt”. The video intercuts scenes of Yamin singing as he descends an ornate staircase with scenes of a young woman receiving a series of cards that lead her to an encounter with a magician (Farrell Dillon)  and a breakdancer (one of the members of SuperCr3w) and concludes at the Los Angeles Theater. The theater marquee displays “Fight for Love”. Alone in the theater auditorium, the woman reads the last of the cards and turns to find Yamin and his band onstage performing for her. She smiles in joyful recognition and the contents of the cards are revealed to the viewer in flashbacks: each card contains romantic lyrics from the song. The video was directed by Nick Spanos, who also directed the video for Yamin's hit "Wait for You".

Reception
The song received a positive review from Alex Vitoulis of Billboard:

Charts

References

2009 singles
Elliott Yamin songs
Songs written by Johntá Austin
2009 songs